= Football at the 2013 Central American Games – Men's tournament =

2013 Central American Games
Tournament details
- Host country: Costa Rica
- City: San Jose, Costa Rica
- Dates: 7–16 March 2013
- Venue: 1 (in 1 host city)

The 2013 Central American Games football tournament is an under-21 age group association football tournament.

== Venues ==
Estadio Nacional
Capacity: 35,100
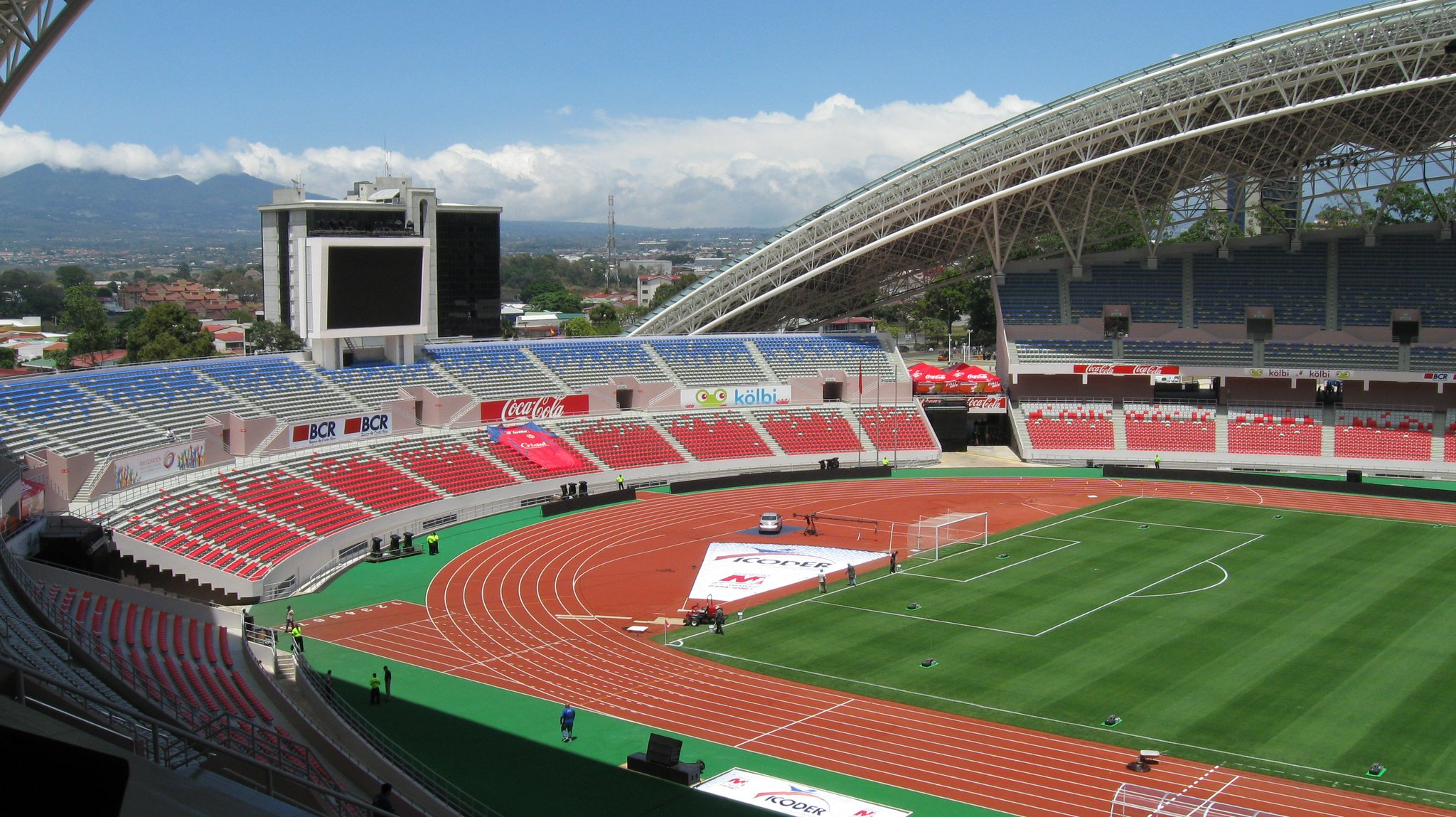
San José
9°56′11″N 84°6′28″W
